Charlie Hardy (1 April 1887 – 19 May 1968) was an Australian rules footballer who played for North Melbourne in the Victorian Football Association (VFA) during the 1910s and Essendon in the Victorian Football League (VFL) during the early 1920s.

VFA
Hardy played with North Melbourne in the VFA for over a decade where he formed a strong ruck combination with Syd Barker. At just 157 cm and 54 kg Hardy is one of the smallest players to ever play at a top level.

He captained the club in 1914, and served as a brilliant rover helping North to premiership victories in 1910, 1914, 1915 and 1918. He was also a member of the famous "invincibles" side that went undefeated in a record 58 games. Hardy left the club along with many of his teammates upon the temporary disbanding of North Melbourne in 1921, and joined Essendon in the VFL.

Essendon
Hardy made his senior VFL debut in Round 10 of the 1921 season he was aged 34 and became the oldest player in the history of the league to make his debut. In 1921 he also represented Victoria at the Perth Carnival. Hardy continued to be a leading player for Essendon, playing in both the 1923 and the 1924 premiership teams. Hardy retired at the end of the 1925 VFL season, aged 38, becoming the oldest player to play a League match for Essendon, since overtaken by Dustin Fletcher at 40 years and 21 days.

Coaching
Hardy started his coaching career at VFA club Coburg and coached them to premierships in 1926 and 1927, the club's first two. This effort saw him rejoin Essendon in 1928 as their non playing coach and he spent three years in this role with the Bombers, narrowly missing the finals on each occasion. In 1931 he crossed to St Kilda and was coach for two seasons, with little success. During the First World War recess in the VFA, he went to Williamstown Juniors in the VJFA as captain-coach during 1916 when the incumbent coach, former Williamstown player Reg Wallis, was badly injured early in the season and ruled out for the remainder of the year. Williamstown Juniors won the premiership in that season and followed it up with another in 1917 before Hardy returned to North Melbourne.

References

External links

Coaching record

1887 births
1968 deaths
Australian rules footballers from Victoria (Australia)
Australian Rules footballers: place kick exponents
Players of Australian handball
North Melbourne Football Club (VFA) players
Essendon Football Club players
Essendon Football Club Premiership players
Essendon Football Club coaches
St Kilda Football Club coaches
Coburg Football Club coaches
Two-time VFL/AFL Premiership players